Ditchling Museum of Art + Craft is located in Ditchling, East Sussex, England (OS Grid Reference TQ 32486 15293). It specialises in showcasing the artists and craftspeople who made Ditchling a creative hub in the 20th century, such as Eric Gill, the sculptor, printmaker and typeface designer, Edward Johnston, designer of the London Underground font, and printer Hilary Pepler. These artisans were associated with The Guild of St Joseph and St Dominic, an offshoot of the Arts and Crafts movement.

The museum is located in the centre of the village just below Saint Margaret's Church on a site that was founded in 1985 by sisters Hilary and Joanna Bourne as a place to display their collection of local artworks. In 2012, a renovation project was commenced with funding of £2.3M via a grant from the Heritage Lottery Fund and other donors. The refurbishment, completed in late 2013, was designed by London practice Adam Richards Architects. The museum was then opened by Nicholas Serota. It is a registered charity under English law.

The building dates back to 1836, when it was the first village national school. It began with one classroom and a schoolmaster's cottage, then in 1887, the school was extended; and by 1915, enrolled 128 pupils. After the school closed in 1983, the Bourne sisters saved the building from demolition and developed it into their museum.

References

Further reading

External links
 

1985 establishments in England
Museums established in 1985
Local museums in East Sussex
Art museums and galleries in East Sussex
Printing museums in England
Charities based in East Sussex
Museum of Art + Craft